The 1892 Navy Midshipmen football team represented the United States Naval Academy during the 1892 college football season. In their first and only season under head coach Ben Crosby, the Midshipmen compiled a 5–2 record and outscored their opponents by a combined score of 121 to 62.

Schedule

References

Navy
Navy Midshipmen football seasons
Navy Midshipmen football